Spotify is a proprietary Swedish audio streaming and media services provider founded on 23 April 2006 by Daniel Ek and Martin Lorentzon. It is one of the largest music streaming service providers, with over 489 million monthly active users, including 205 million paying subscribers, as of December 2022. Spotify is listed (through a Luxembourg City-domiciled holding company, Spotify Technology S.A.) on the New York Stock Exchange in the form of American depositary receipts.

Spotify offers digital copyright restricted recorded audio content, including more than 100 million songs and five million podcasts, from record labels and media companies. As a freemium service, basic features are free with advertisements and limited control, while additional features, such as offline listening and commercial-free listening, are offered via paid subscriptions. Users can search for music based on artist, album, or genre, and can create, edit, and share playlists.

Spotify is available in most of Europe, as well as Africa, the Americas, Asia, and Oceania, with a total availability in 184 markets.  Its users and subscribers are based largely in the US and Europe, jointly accounting for around 53% of users and 67% of revenue. It has no presence in mainland China where the market is dominated by QQ Music. The service is available on most devices including Windows, macOS, and Linux computers, iOS and Android smartphones and tablets, smart home devices such as the Amazon Echo and Google Nest lines of products and digital media players like Roku.

Unlike physical or download sales, which pay artists a fixed price per song or album sold, Spotify pays royalties based on the number of artist streams as a proportion of total songs streamed. It distributes approximately 70% of its total revenue to rights holders (often record labels), who then pay artists based on individual agreements.

History 

Spotify was founded in 2006 in Stockholm, Sweden, by Daniel Ek, former CTO of Stardoll, and Martin Lorentzon, co-founder of Tradedoubler. According to Ek, the company's title was initially misheard from a name shouted by Lorentzon. Later they thought out a portmanteau of "spot" and "identify".

Early international launches 

In February 2010, Spotify opened public registration for the free service tier in the United Kingdom. Registrations surged following the release of the mobile service, leading Spotify to halt registration for the free service in September, returning the UK to an invitation-only policy.

Spotify launched in the United States in July 2011, and offered a six-month, ad-supported trial period, during which new users could listen to an unlimited amount of music for free. In January 2012, the free trial periods began to expire, and limited users to ten hours of streaming each month and five plays per song. Using PC streaming, you would see a similar structure to what we see today, with a listener being able to play songs freely, but with ads every 4–7 songs depending on listening duration. Later that same year, in March, Spotify removed all limits on the free service tier indefinitely, including mobile devices.

In April 2016, Ek and Lorentzon wrote an open letter to Swedish politicians, demanding action in three areas that they claimed hindered the company's ability to recruit top talent as Spotify grows, including access to flexible housing, better education in the programming and development fields, and stock options. Ek and Lorentzon wrote that to continue competing in a global economy, politicians needed to respond with new policies, or else thousands of Spotify jobs would be moved from Sweden to the United States.

In February 2017, Spotify announced expansion of its United States operations in Lower Manhattan, New York City, at 4 World Trade Center, adding approximately 1,000 new jobs and retaining 832 existing positions. The company's US headquarters are located in New York City's Flatiron District.

On 14 November 2018, the company announced a total of 13 new markets in the MENA region, including the creation of a new Arabic hub and several playlists.

Other developments

Streaming records 

In October 2015, "Thinking Out Loud" by Ed Sheeran became the first song to pass 500 million streams. A month later, Spotify announced that "Lean On" by Major Lazer and DJ Snake featuring MØ was its most-streamed song of all time with over 525 million streams worldwide. In April 2016, Rihanna overtook Justin Bieber to become the biggest artist on Spotify, with 31.3 million monthly active listeners. In May 2016, Rihanna was overtaken by Drake with 31.85 million total streams. In December 2016, Drake's just-under 36 million monthly listeners were overtaken by the Weeknd's 36.068 million. Later that same month, Drake's song "One Dance" became the first song to hit one billion streams on Spotify. Upon its release in August 2017, the single "Look What You Made Me Do" by Taylor Swift earned over eight million streams within 24 hours, breaking the record for the most single-day streams for a track. On 19 June 2018, XXXTentacion's hit single "Sad!" broke Swift's single-day streaming record, amassing 10.4 million streams the day after he was fatally shot in Florida.

User growth 
In March 2011, Spotify announced a customer base of 1 million paying subscribers across Europe, and by September 2011, the number of paying subscribers had doubled to two million. In August 2012, Time reported 15 million active users, four million being paying Spotify subscribers. User growth continued, reaching 20 million total active users, including five million paying customers globally and one million paying customers in the United States, in December 2012. By March 2013, the service had 24 million active users, six million being paying subscribers, which grew to 40 million users (including ten million paying) in May 2014, 60 million users (including 15 million paying) in December 2014, 75 million users (20 million paying) in June 2015, 30 million paying subscribers in March 2016, 40 million paying subscribers in September 2016, and 100 million total users in June 2016. In April 2020, Spotify reached 133 million premium users. In countries affected by the COVID-19 pandemic, Spotify registered a fall in users in late February, but it has seen a recovery. In March 2022, Spotify had 182 million premium subscribers. At the end of Q2 2022, Spotify reported 188 million paying subscribers and 433 million total users.

Premium-exclusive albums 
The Financial Times reported in March 2017 that, as part of its efforts to renegotiate new licensing deals with music labels, Spotify and major record labels had agreed that Spotify would restrict some newly released albums to its Premium tier, with Spotify receiving a reduction in royalty fees to do so. Select albums would be available only on the Premium tier for a period of time, before general release. The deal "may be months away from being finalized, but Spotify is said to have cleared this particular clause with major record labels". New reports in April confirmed that Spotify and Universal Music Group had reached an agreement to allow artists part of Universal to limit their new album releases to the Premium service tier for a maximum of two weeks. Spotify CEO Daniel Ek commented that "We know that not every album by every artist should be released the same way, and we've worked hard with UMG to develop a new, flexible release policy. Starting today, Universal artists can choose to release new albums on premium only for two weeks, offering subscribers an earlier chance to explore the complete creative work, while the singles are available across Spotify for all our listeners to enjoy". It was announced later in April that this type of agreement would be extended to indie artists signed to the Merlin Network agency.

Direct public offering 
Spotify went public on the stock market in April 2018 using a direct public offering rather than an initial public offering. This approach is not intended to raise fresh capital, but to let investors get their returns. Morgan Stanley is the company's slated advisor on the matter.

After making its debut on the New York Stock Exchange on 3 April 2018, CNBC reported that Spotify opened at $165.90, more than 25% above its reference price of $132.

2020 hacking incident 
On 3 July 2020, cybersecurity firm VPNMentor discovered a database containing 380 million individual records, including the logins and passwords of Spotify users. The database was thought to be evidence of an impending credential stuffing cyberattack targeting Spotify as it contained the credentials of up to 350,000 compromised user accounts. In response to the attack, Spotify issued a rolling reset of passwords for affected accounts in November 2020.

Acquisitions and exclusivity deals 
In May 2013, Spotify acquired music discovery app Tunigo. In March 2014, they acquired The Echo Nest, a music intelligence company. In June 2015, Spotify announced they had acquired Seed Scientific, a data science consulting firm and analytics company. In a comment to TechCrunch, Spotify said that Seed Scientific's team would lead an advanced analytics unit within the company, focused on developing data services. In January 2016, they acquired social and messaging startups Cord Project and Soundwave, followed in April 2016 by CrowdAlbum, a "startup that collects photos and videos of performances shared on social networks," and would "enhance the development of products that help artists understand, activate, and monetize their audiences". In November 2016, Spotify acquired Preact, a "cloud-based platform and service developed for companies that operate on subscription models which helps reduce churn and build up their subscriber numbers".

In March 2017, Spotify acquired Sonalytic, an audio detection startup, for an undisclosed amount of money. Spotify stated that Sonalytic would be used to improve the company's personalized playlists, better match songs with compositions, and improve the company's publishing data system. Later that month, Spotify also acquired MightyTV, an app connected to television streaming services, including Netflix and HBO Go, that recommends content to users. Spotify intended to use MightyTV to improve its advertising efforts on the free tier of service. In April 2017, they acquired Mediachain, a blockchain startup that had been developing a decentralized database system for managing attribution, and other metadata for media. This was followed in May 2017 with the acquisition of artificial intelligence startup Niland, which uses technology to improve personalisation and recommendation features for users. In November 2017, Spotify acquired Soundtrap, an online music studio startup.

On 12 April 2018, Spotify acquired the music licensing platform Loudr. In August 2018, Spotify bought the exclusive rights to The Joe Budden Podcast and expanded the show to a twice-weekly schedule. On 6 February 2019, Spotify acquired the podcast networks Gimlet Media and Anchor FM Inc., with the goal of establishing themselves as a leading figure in podcasting. On 26 March 2019, Spotify announced they would acquire another podcast network, Parcast. On 12 September 2019, Spotify acquired SoundBetter, a music production marketplace for people in the music industry to collaborate on projects, and distribute music tracks for licensing. On 19 November 2019, Spotify announced the acquisition of the exclusive rights to The Last Podcast on the Left.

On 5 February 2020, Spotify announced its intent to acquire Bill Simmons' sports and pop culture blog and podcast network The Ringer for an undisclosed amount.  On 19 May 2020, Spotify acquired exclusive rights to stream the popular podcast The Joe Rogan Experience beginning in September of that year, under an agreement valued at around US$100 million.

In March 2021, Spotify acquired app developer Betty Labs and their live social audio app, Locker Room, On 12 May 2021. Armchair Expert announced on Instagram that the podcast would be available exclusively on Spotify beginning 1 July, saying they would continue to maintain the same creative control over the show after the move. Locker Room was rebranded in June 2021 as Spotify Greenroom, and turned into a Clubhouse competitor. The same month, Spotify acquired Podz, a podcast discovery startup. Also the same month, Spotify bought the exclusive rights to the Call Her Daddy podcast. In November 2021, Spotify acquired audiobook company Findaway, including its publishing imprint OrangeSky Audio. In December 2021, Spotify acquired Whooshkaa, a podcast tech company that develops specialized technology that allows radio broadcasters to easily turn their existing audio content into on-demand podcast programming.

In February 2022, Spotify acquired Chartable and Podsights. Both are podcast advertising companies. In 2022, Spotify Greenroom rebranded as Spotify Live.
In June 2022, Spotify acquired Sonantic, a synthetic voice and video developer. In July 2022, Spotify acquired Heardle, a Wordle-inspired music trivia game, for an undisclosed amount. In October 2022, Spotify acquired the Dublin-based content moderation startup, Kinzen. In 2023, Spotify merged Anchor into their Spotify for Podcasters tool, a rebranding move and to organize its tools for creating, managing, growing, and monetizing their content in one place.

Company partnerships 
In January 2015, Sony announced PlayStation Music, a new music service with Spotify as its exclusive partner. PlayStation Music incorporates the Spotify service into Sony's PlayStation 3 and PlayStation 4 gaming consoles, and Sony Xperia mobile devices. The service launched on 30 March 2015. In March 2017, Spotify announced a partnership with the South by Southwest (SXSW) conference for 2017, presenting specific content in special playlists through an SXSW hub in Spotify's apps. The integration also enabled Spotify within the SXSW GO app to help users discover and explore artists performing at the conference. Two more partnerships were announced in March; one with WNYC Studios, and one with Waze. The WNYC Studios partnership brought various podcasts from WNYC to Spotify, including Note To Self, On the Media and Here's the Thing. Spotify also announced that the third season of WNYC Studios' 2 Dope Queens podcast would premiere with a two-week exclusivity period on the service on 21 March 2017. The Waze partnership allows Waze app users to view directions to destinations within the Spotify app and access their Spotify playlists through the Waze app.

In October 2017, Microsoft announced that it would be ending its Groove Music streaming service by December, with all music from users transferring to Spotify as part of a new partnership. In December, Spotify and Tencent's music arm, Tencent Music Entertainment (TME), agreed to swap stakes and make an investment in each other's music businesses. As a result of this transaction, Spotify gained a 9% stake in TME with TME gaining a 7.5% stake in Spotify.

In February 2018, Spotify integrated with the gaming-oriented voice chat service Discord on desktop clients, allowing users to display their currently playing song as a rich presence on their profile, and invite other users with Spotify Premium to group "listening parties". In April, Spotify announced a discounted entertainment bundle with video-on-demand provider Hulu, which included discounted rates for university students.

In May 2020, Spotify teamed up with ESPN and Netflix to curate podcasts around their Michael Jordan documentary The Last Dance, and in September, Spotify signed a deal with Chernin Entertainment to produce movies and TV shows.

In 2020 and 2021, Spotify and DC, a brand at the time under Warner Bros. Entertainment signed deals to create audio shows on the platform around characters such as Catwoman, Wonder Woman, the Riddler, Batgirl, Superman and Lois Lane, among others. 

In 2022, Spotify became the official streaming partner of FC Barcelona.

In May 2022, Spotify announced a partnership with the online game platform and game creation system the Roblox Corporation, the partnership saw Spotify as the first streaming brand to have a presence within the game with the launch of "Spotify Island".

In March 2023, Spotify announced a partnership with Patreon, which Spotify claimed would "enable creators to expand their creative business through direct payments from fans, and allow fans to listen to their Patreon content on Spotify."

Dispute with Apple 

In July 2015, Spotify launched an email campaign to urge its App Store subscribers to cancel their subscriptions and start new ones through its website, bypassing the 30% transaction fee for in-app purchases required for iOS applications by technology company Apple Inc. A later update to the Spotify app on iOS was rejected by Apple, prompting Spotify's general counsel Horacio Gutierrez to write a letter to Apple's then-general counsel Bruce Sewell, stating: "This latest episode raises serious concerns under both U.S. and EU competition law. It continues a troubling pattern of behavior by Apple to exclude and diminish the competitiveness of Spotify on iOS and as a rival to Apple Music, particularly when seen against the backdrop of Apple's previous anticompetitive conduct aimed at Spotify ... we cannot stand by as Apple uses the App Store approval process as a weapon to harm competitors."

Sewell responded to the letter: "We find it troubling that you are asking for exemptions to the rules we apply to all developers and are publicly resorting to rumors and half-truths about our service." He also elaborated that "Our guidelines apply equally to all app developers, whether they are game developers, e-book sellers, video-streaming services or digital music distributors; and regardless of whether they compete against Apple. We did not alter our behavior or our rules when we introduced our own music streaming service or when Spotify became a competitor". Furthermore, he stated that "There is nothing in Apple's conduct that 'amounts to a violation of applicable antitrust laws.' Far from it. ... I would be happy to facilitate an expeditious review and approval of your app as soon as you provide us with something that is compliant with the App Store's rules".

In the following months, Spotify joined several other companies in filing a letter with the European Union's antitrust body indirectly accusing Apple and Google of "abusing their 'privileged position' at the top of the market", by referring to "some" companies as having "transformed into 'gatekeepers' rather than 'gateways'". The complaint led to the European Union announcing that it would prepare an initiative by the end of 2017 for a possible law addressing unfair competition practices.

Spotify released the first version of its Apple Watch app in November 2018, allowing playback control of the iPhone via the watch. Users can also choose which devices to play music on via Bluetooth. In a further escalation of the dispute with Apple, on 13 March 2019, Spotify filed an antitrust complaint with the European Commission over unfair app store practices. Two days later, Apple responded, stating that the claim was misleading rhetoric and that Spotify wanted benefits of a free app without being a free app. Spotify responded with a statement calling Apple a monopolist and stated that they had only filed the complaint as Apple's actions hurt competition and consumers and clearly violated the law. It also said that Apple believed Spotify users on the app store were Apple's customers and not Spotify's.

Apple responded to Spotify's claims by counter-claiming that Spotify's market reach and user base would not have been possible without the Apple App Store platform. Additionally, Apple stated that they have attempted to work with Spotify to integrate the service better with Apple's products, such as Siri and Apple Watch. In 2019, under iOS 13, it became possible to play Spotify music using Siri commands.

Spotify was one of the first companies to support Epic Games in their lawsuit against Apple, which was filed after Epic also tried to bypass Apple's 30% fee for microtransactions in Fortnite. In September 2020, Spotify, Epic, and other companies founded The Coalition for App Fairness, which aims for better conditions for the inclusion of apps in app stores.

Dispute with Kakao Entertainment Corp. 
On 1 March 2021, Spotify confirmed that its platform would no longer have access to music from artists represented by Kakao Entertainment. However, after talking it out and renewing the contracts between the two, Spotify later announced that they had reached an agreement with Kakao Entertainment, allowing their content to be available once again on the platform across the globe.

Functionality 
In November 2021, Spotify hid the "shuffle" button for albums following a request by singer Adele, arguing that tracks in albums are supposed to be played back in the order specified by the artist in order to "tell a story".

NFTs 
In May 2022, Spotify began testing a feature that would allow select artists to promote their NFTs via their profiles. Some artists included in this initial test phase were Steve Aoki and The Wombats.  The testing was very limited in nature and was only available on Spotify's Android app in the US.

Business model 
Spotify operates under a freemium business model (basic services are free, while additional features are offered via paid subscriptions). Spotify generates revenue by selling premium streaming subscriptions to users and advertising placements to third parties. Some of the premium options users may choose from include individual, duo, family, and student.

In December 2013, the company launched a new website, "Spotify for Artists, " explaining its business model and revenue data. Spotify gets its content from major record labels as well as independent artists and pays copyright holders royalties for streaming music. The company pays 70% of its total revenue to rights holders. Spotify for Artists states that the company does not have a fixed per-play rate; instead, it considers factors such as the user's home country and the individual artist's royalty rate. Rights holders received an average per-play payout between $.000029 and $.0084.

Spotify offers an unlimited subscription package, close to the Open Music Model (OMM) estimated economic equilibrium for the recording industry. However, the incorporation of digital rights management (DRM) limitation diverges from the OMM and competitors such as iTunes Store and Amazon Music that have dropped DRM.

In 2013, Spotify revealed that it paid artists an average of $0.007 per stream. Music Week editor Tim Ingham commented that while the figure may “initially seem alarming,” he noted: "Unlike buying a CD or download, streaming is not a one-off payment. Hundreds of millions of streams of tracks are happening every day, which quickly multiplies the potential revenues on offer – and is a constant long-term source of income for artists." According to Ben Sisario of The New York Times, approximately 13,000 out of seven million artists (0.19%) on Spotify generated $50,000 or more in payments in 2020.

Accounts and subscriptions 
As of August 2022, the three Spotify subscription types are:

None of these subscriptions limit listening time.

In March 2014, Spotify introduced a discounted Premium subscription tier for students in which students in the United States enrolled in a university pay half-price for a Premium subscription. In April 2017, the discount was expanded to 33 more countries.

Spotify introduced a Family subscription in October 2014, which allows up to 5 family members to have a premium subscription. In May 2016, the limit was changed to 6 family members, and the price was reduced. The Family subscription provides access to Spotify Kids.

In November 2018, Spotify announced it was opening up Spotify Connect to all of the users using its Free service, however, these changes still required products supporting Spotify Connect to support the latest software development kit.

In July 2020, Spotify added another tier, Premium Duo. This is aimed at couples and for $12.99 it lets up to 2 people (living at the same address) share a subscription.

In February 2021, Spotify announced their plans to introduce a HiFi subscription, to offer listening in high fidelity, lossless sound quality. The rollout for the HiFi tier is yet to be announced.

In August 2021, Spotify launched a test subscription tier called Spotify Plus. The subscription costs $0.99 and is supposed to be a combination of the free and premium tiers. Subscribers to this plan will still receive ads but will get the ability to listen to songs without shuffle mode and skip any number of tracks. The company reported that the tier conditions may change before its full launch. This might have been discontinued (at least in some regions) according to an email sent to a redditor.

Monetization 
In 2008, just after launch, the company made a loss of 31.8 million Swedish kronor (US$4.4 million). In October 2010, Wired reported that Spotify was making more money for labels in Sweden than any other retailer "online or off". Years after growth and expansion, a November 2012 report suggested strong momentum for the company. In 2011, it reported a near US$60 million net loss from revenue of $244 million, while it was expected to generate a net loss of $40 million from revenue of $500 million in 2012. Another source of income was music purchases from within the app, however this service was removed in January 2013.

In May 2016, Spotify announced "Sponsored Playlists", a monetisation opportunity in which brands can specify the audiences they have in mind, with Spotify matching the marketer with suitable music in a playlist. That September, Spotify announced that it had paid a total of over $5 billion to the music industry. In June 2017, as part of renegotiated licenses with Universal Music Group and Merlin Network, Spotify's financial filings revealed its agreement to pay more than $2 billion in minimum payments over the next two years.

, Spotify was not yet a profitable company. Spotify's revenue for Q1 2020 amounted to €1.85 billion ($2 billion). A large part of this sum, €1.7 billion ($1.84 billion), came from Spotify Premium subscribers. Gross profit in the same quarter amounted to €472 million ($511 million), with an operating loss of €17 million ($18 million). Despite subscriber and podcasts growth, during Q2 of 2020, Spotify reported a loss of €356 million (€1.91 per share). The "deeper" loss came as a result of the company's tax debt to over one-third of its employees in Sweden.

Funding 
In February 2010, Spotify received a small investment from Founders Fund, where board member Sean Parker was recruited to assist Spotify in "winning the labels over in the world's largest music market". In June 2011, Spotify secured $100 million of funding and planned to use this to support its US launch. The new round of funding valued the company at $1 billion. A Goldman Sachs-led round of funding closed in November 2012, raising around $100 million at a $3 billion valuation.

In April 2015, Spotify began another round of fundraising, with a report from The Wall Street Journal stating it was seeking $400 million, which would value the company at $8.4 billion. The financing was closed in June 2015, with Spotify raising $526 million, at a value of $8.53 billion. In January 2016, Spotify raised another $500 million through convertible bonds.

In March 2016, Spotify raised $1 billion in financing by debt plus a discount of 20% on shares once the initial public offering (IPO) of shares takes place. The company was, according to TechCrunch, planning to launch on the stock market in 2017, but in 2017 it was seen as planning on doing the IPO in 2018 in order to "build up a better balance sheet and work on shifting its business model to improve its margins".

Downloads 
In March 2009, Spotify began offering music downloads in the United Kingdom, France, and Spain. Users could purchase tracks from Spotify, which partnered with 7digital to incorporate the feature. The ability to purchase and download music tracks via the app was removed on 4 January 2013.

Spotify for Artists 
In November 2015, Spotify introduced a "Fan Insights" panel in limited beta form, letting artists and managers access data on monthly listeners, geographical data, demographic information, music preferences and more. In April 2017, the panel was upgraded to leave beta status, renamed as "Spotify for Artists", and opened to all artists and managers. Additional features include the ability to get "verified" status with a blue checkmark on an artist's profile, receiving artist support from Spotify, customising the profile page with photos and promoting a certain song as their "pick".

In September 2018, Spotify announced "Upload Beta", allowing artists to upload directly to the platform instead of going through a distributor or record label. The feature was rolled out to a small number of US-based artists by invitation only. Uploading was free and artists received 100% of the revenue from songs they uploaded; artists were able to control when their release went public. On 1 July 2019, Spotify deprecated the program and announced plans to stop accepting direct uploads by the end of that month and eventually remove all content uploaded in this manner.

Industry initiatives 
In June 2017, Variety reported that Spotify would announce "Secret Genius", a new initiative aimed at highlighting songwriters and producers, and the effect those people have on the music industry and the artists' careers. The project, which would feature awards, "Songshops" songwriting workshops, curated playlists, and podcasts, is an effort to "shine a light on these people behind the scenes who play such a big role in some of the most important moments of our lives. When the general public hears a song, they automatically associate it with the artist who sings it, not the people behind the scenes who make it happen, so we thought the title Secret Genius was appropriate", Spotify's former Global Head of Creator Services Troy Carter told Variety the first awards ceremony would take place in late 2017, and was intended to honour "the top songwriters, producers and publishers in the industry as well as up-and-coming talent." Additionally, as part of "The Ambassador Program", 13 songwriters would each host a Songshop workshop, in which their peers would collaboratively attempt to create a hit song, with the first workshop taking place in Los Angeles in June 2017.

In October 2017, Spotify launched "Rise", a program aimed at promoting emerging artists. In February 2020, Spotify announced it would be featuring new songwriter pages and 'written by' playlists. This was aimed at giving fans a behind the scenes look at the process of some of their favorite songwriters. Initial pages added included Justin Trantor, Meghan Trainor, and Missy Elliott. Spotify thereafter announced it was planning to add more of these pages and playlists to highlight songwriters.

In January 2021, Spotify made a selection of audiobooks available on the platform as a test of developing a greater breadth of content for users. The addition of audiobooks to the service would create similar offerings to that of Amazon's Audible. In 2020, Spotify partnered with Wizarding World to release a series of recorded readings of Harry Potter and the Philosopher's Stone, by various stars of the franchise.

Stations by Spotify 
On 31 January 2018, Spotify started testing a new Pandora-styled standalone app called Stations by Spotify for Australian Android users. It featured 62 music channels, each devoted to a particular genre. Spotify itself has two channels named after its playlists that link directly to the users' profile: "Release Radar" and "Discover Weekly". The aim was to help users to listen to the music they want without information overload or spending time building their own playlists. At launch, the skipping feature was not featured to "reinforce the feel of radio", but it was quietly added later and with no limits. Songs can be "loved" but cannot be "hated". If a song is "loved", a custom radio channel will be created based on it, and when there are at least 15 of these songs, a "My Favourites" channel is unlocked.

The standalone app was made available to all iOS and Android users in the United States since 4 June 2019.

Spotify announced the app would be shut down on 16 May 2022. The company said users would be able to login into the main Spotify app with their Stations account and transfer their stations into Spotify.

Platforms 

Spotify has client software currently available for Windows, macOS, Wear OS, Android, iOS, watchOS, iPadOS, PlayStation 4, PlayStation 5, Xbox One and Xbox Series X/S game consoles. There is an official, although unsupported Linux version. Spotify also offers a proprietary protocol known as "Spotify Connect", which lets users listen to music through a wide range of entertainment systems, including speakers, receivers, TVs, cars, and smartwatches. Spotify also has a web player (open.spotify.com). Offline Music listening is possible on watchOS and more recently added to google's WearOS for those with premium subscriptions. Unlike the apps, the web player does not have the ability to download music for offline listening. In June 2017, Spotify became available as an app through Windows Store.

Features 
In Spotify's apps, music can be browsed or searched for via various parameters, such as artist, album, genre, playlist, or record label. Users can create, edit and share playlists, share tracks on social media, and make playlists with other users. Spotify provides access to over 100 million songs, 5 million podcasts, and 4 billion playlists.

In November 2011, Spotify introduced a Spotify Apps service that made it possible for third-party developers to design applications that could be hosted within the Spotify computer software. The applications provided features such as synchronised lyrics, music reviews, and song recommendations. In June 2012, Soundrop became the first Spotify app to attract major funding, receiving $3 million from Spotify investor Northzone. However, after the June 2014 announcement of a Web API that allowed third-party developers to integrate Spotify content in their own web applications, the company discontinued its Spotify Apps platform in October, stating that its new development tools for the Spotify web player fulfilled many of the advantages of the former Spotify Apps service, but "would ensure the Spotify platform remained relevant and easy to develop on, as well as enabling you to build innovative and engaging music experiences".

In April 2012, Spotify introduced a "Spotify Play Button", an embeddable music player that can be added to blogs, websites, or social media profiles, that lets visitors listen to a specific song, playlist, or album without leaving the page. The following November, the company began rolling out a web player, with a similar design to its computer programs, but without the requirement of any installation.

In December 2012, Spotify introduced a "Follow" tab and a "Discover" tab, along with a "Collection" section. "Follow" lets users follow artists and friends to see what they are listening to, while "Discover" directs users to new releases as well as music, review, and concert recommendations based on listening history. Users can add tracks to a "Collection" section of the app, rather than adding them to a specific playlist. The features were announced by CEO Daniel Ek at a press conference, with Ek saying that a common user complaint about the service was that "Spotify is great when you know what music you want to listen to, but not when you don't".

In May 2015, Spotify announced a new "Home" start-page that could recommend music. The company also introduced "Spotify Running", a feature aimed at improving music while running with music matched to running tempo, and announced that podcasts and videos ("entertainment, news and clips") would be coming to Spotify, along with "Spotify Originals" content.

In December 2015, Spotify debuted Spotify Wrapped, a program that creates playlists based on each user's most listened-to songs from the year. Users then can view and save this playlist at the end of the year.   While it continued to provide users with an end-of-the-year wrap up, the playlist feature was later removed.

In January 2016, Spotify and music annotation service Genius formed a partnership, bringing annotation information from Genius into infocards presented while songs are playing in Spotify. The functionality is limited to selected playlists and was only available on Spotify's iOS app at launch, being expanded to the Android app in April 2017. This feature was known as "Behind the Lyrics". As of 18 November 2021, "Behind the Lyrics" has been replaced with auto-generated real-time lyrics due to consumer demand. The feature is powered by lyrics provider Musixmatch.<ref>Spotify finally rolls out real-time lyrics to global users – TechCrunch (published 18 November 2021)</ref>

In May 2017, Spotify introduced Spotify Codes for its mobile apps, a way for users to share specific artists, tracks, playlists or albums with other people. Users find the relevant content to share and press a "soundwave-style barcode" on the display. A camera icon in the apps' search fields lets other users point their device's camera at the code, which takes them to the same content.

In January 2019, Spotify introduced Car View for Android, allowing devices running Android to have a compact Now Playing screen when the device is connected to a car's Bluetooth. Also in January 2019, Spotify beta-tested its Canvas feature, where artists and/or labels can upload looping 3 to 8-second moving visuals to their tracks, replacing album covers in the "Now Playing" view; users have the option to turn off this feature. Canvas is only available for Spotify's iOS and Android mobile apps. Months later, Spotify tested its own version of stories (the sharing format popularized by social apps) known as "Storyline", and the focus is on allowing artists to share their own insights, inspiration, details about their creative process or other meanings behind the music.

In March 2021, Spotify announced an upcoming option for higher-resolution sound, Spotify Hi-Fi.

 Playlists and discovery 
In July 2015, Spotify launched Discover Weekly, a playlist generated weekly.  Updated on Mondays, it provides users with music recommendations. In December 2015, Quartz reported that songs in Discover Weekly playlists had been streamed 1.7 billion times,.

In March 2016, Spotify launched six playlists branded as Fresh Finds, including the main playlist and Fire Emoji, Basement, Hiptronix, Six Strings, and Cyclone (hip-hop, electronic, pop, guitar-driven, and experimental music respectively). The playlists spotlight songs by lesser-known musicians and their songs.

In August 2016, Spotify launched Release Radar, a personalized playlist that allows users to stay up-to-date on new music released by the artists they listen to the most. It also helps users discover new music, by mixing in other artists' music. The playlist is updated every Friday, and is a maximum of two hours in length.

The RADAR program is Spotify's global artist program, exclusively designed to help emerging artists worldwide reach the next stage in their careers and strengthen their connection to listeners. 

Spotify provides artists taking part in RADAR with resources and access to integrated marketing opportunities to help them boost their careers, in addition to expanded reach and exposure to 178 markets worldwide.

In September 2016, Spotify introduced Daily Mix, a series of (up to six) playlists that mixes the user's favorite tracks with new, recommended songs. New users can access Daily Mix after approximately two weeks of listening to music through Spotify. Daily Mixes were only available on the Android and iOS mobile apps at launch, but the feature was later expanded to Spotify's computer app in December 2016.

In 2017, Spotify introduced RapCaviar, a hip-hop playlist. Rap Caviar had 10.9 million followers by 2019, becoming one of Spotify's Top 5 playlists. RapCaviar was originally curated by Tuma Basa. It was  relaunched by Carl Chery in 2019.

In July 2018, Spotify introduced a beta feature that gives artists, labels, and teams an easy way to submit unreleased music directly to Spotify's editorial team for playlist consideration. 

In June 2019, Spotify launched a custom playlist titled "Your Daily Drive" that closely replicates the drive time format of many traditional radio stations. It combines short-form podcast news updates from The Wall Street Journal, NPR, and PRI with a mix of a user's favorite songs and artists interspersed with tracks the listener has yet to discover. "Your Daily Drive", which is found in a user's library under the "Made For You" section, updates throughout the day.

In May 2020, Spotify introduced the Group Session feature. This feature allows two or more Premium users in the same location to share control over the music that's being played. The Group Session feature was later expanded to allow any Premium user to join/participate in a Group Session, with a special link the host can send to participants.

In July 2021, Spotify launched the "What's New" feed, a section that collects all new releases and episodes from artists and podcasts that the user follows. The feature is represented by a bell icon on the app's main page and is available on iOS and Android.

In November 2021, Spotify launched the City and Local Pulse charts, aimed at representing the songs listened to in major cities around the world. The charts are available for 200 cities with the most listeners on Spotify.

 Listening limitations 
Spotify has experimented with different limitations to users' listening on the Free service tier.

In April 2011, Spotify announced via a blog post that they would drastically cut the amount of music that free members could access, effective 1 May 2011. The post stated that all free members would be limited to ten hours of music streaming per month, and in addition, individual tracks were limited to five plays. New users were exempt from these changes for six months. In March 2013, the five-play individual track limit was removed for users in the United Kingdom, and media reports stated that users in the United States, Australia, and New Zealand never had the limit in the first place.

In December 2013, CEO Daniel Ek announced that Android and iOS smartphone users with the free service tier could listen to music in Shuffle mode, a feature in which users can stream music by specific artists and playlists without being able to pick which songs to hear. Mobile listening previously was not allowed in Spotify Free accounts. Ek stated that "We're giving people the best free music experience in the history of the smartphone." This shuffle feature is not available on Android and iOS tablets, or computers.

In January 2014, Spotify removed all time limits for Free users on all platforms, including on computers, which previously had a 10-hour monthly listening limit after a 6-month grace period.

In April 2018, Spotify began to allow Free users to listen on-demand to whatever songs they want for an unlimited number of times, as long as the song is on one of the user's 15 personalized discovery playlists.

Before April 2020, all service users were limited to 10,000 songs in their library, after which they would receive an "Epic collection, friend" notification and would not be able to save more music to their library. Adding playlists at this point also arbitrarily removed older playlists from the users' library. Spotify later removed this limit.

 Technical information 

Spotify is proprietary and uses digital rights management (DRM) controls. Spotify's terms and conditions do not permit users to reverse-engineer the application.

Spotify allows users to add local audio files for music not in its catalog into the user's library through Spotify's desktop application, and then allows users to synchronize those music files to Spotify's mobile apps or other computers over the same Wi-Fi network as the primary computer by creating a Spotify playlist, and adding those local audio files to the playlist. Audio files must either be in the .mp3, .mp4 (.mp4 files that have video streams are not supported), or .m4p media formats. This feature is available only for Premium subscribers.

Spotify has a median playback latency of 265 ms (including local cache).

In April 2014, Spotify moved away from the peer-to-peer (P2P) system they had used to distribute music to users. Previously, a desktop user would listen to music from one of three sources: a cached file on the computer, one of Spotify's servers, or from other subscribers through the P2P system. P2P, a well-established Internet distribution system, served as an alternative that reduced Spotify's server resources and costs. However, Spotify ended the P2P setup in 2014, with Spotify's Alison Bonny telling TorrentFreak: "We're gradually phasing out the use of our desktop P2P technology which has helped our users enjoy their music both speedily and seamlessly. We're now at a stage where we can power music delivery through our growing number of servers and ensure our users continue to receive a best-in-class service."

Originally Spotify had their own servers but in 2016 most of their infrastructure was migrated to Google Cloud.

 Car Thing 
Spotify first announced a voice-activated music-streaming gadget for cars in May 2019. Named the Car Thing, it represents the music-streaming service's first entry into hardware devices. In early 2020, as part of filings to the Federal Communications Commission (FCC), submitted images of the device that make it seem much more like a miniature infotainment screen. In April 2021, Spotify rolled out its own voice assistant with the hands-free wake word: "Hey Spotify". Using this, users can perform various actions such as pulling playlists, launching radio stations, playing or pausing songs. This voice-based virtual assistant may be intended more towards Spotify's own hardware such as its "Car Thing".

 Geographic availability 
 The company is incorporated in Luxembourg as Spotify Technology S.A., and is headquartered in Stockholm, Sweden, with offices in 16 countries around the world. Following the 2022 Russian invasion of Ukraine, Spotify temporarily closed its office in Russia and suspended both premium and free services from the country until further notice. However, the support service continues to work for Russian users.

 Sponsorship 
  Barcelona
  Barcelona Femení

 Accolades 
In September 2010, the World Economic Forum (WEF) announced the company as a Technology Pioneer for 2011.

 Criticism 

Spotify has attracted significant criticism since its 2006 launch. The primary point of criticism centres around what artists, music creators, and the media have described as "unsustainable" compensation. Unlike physical sales or legal downloads (both of which were the main medium of listening to music at the time), which pay artists a fixed amount per song or album sold, Spotify pays royalties based on their "market share": the number of streams for their songs as a proportion of total songs streamed on the service. Spotify distributes approximately 70% of its total revenue to rights-holders, who will then pay artists based on their individual agreements. Worldwide, 30,000 musicians have joined the organization UnionOfMusicians (UMAW). UMAW organized protests in 31 cities in March 2021 and its campaign #JusticeAtSpotify is demanding more transparency and a compensation of one cent per stream.

Spotify has been criticised by artists and producers including Thom Yorke and Taylor Swift, who have argued that Spotify does not fairly compensate musicians, and both withdrew their music from the service. Their catalogues returned to the service in 2017. While the streaming music industry in general faces the same critique about inadequate payments, Spotify, being the leading service, faces particular scrutiny due to its free service tier, allowing users to listen to music for free, though with advertisements between tracks. The free service tier has led to a variety of major album releases being delayed or withdrawn from the service. In response to the allegations about unfair compensation, Spotify claims that it is benefitting the industry by migrating users away from unauthorized copying and less monetized platforms to its free service tier, and then downgrades that service until they upgrade to paid accounts. A study has shown that record labels keep a high amount of the money earned from Spotify, and the CEO of Merlin Network, a representative body for over 10,000 independent labels, has also observed significant yearly growth rates in earnings from Spotify, while clarifying that Spotify pays labels, not artists. In 2017, as part of its efforts to renegotiate licence deals for an interest in going public, Spotify announced that artists would be able to make albums temporarily exclusive to paid subscribers if the albums are part of Universal Music Group or the Merlin Network.

In May 2018, Spotify attracted criticism for its "Hate Content & Hateful Conduct policy" that removed the music of R. Kelly and XXXTentacion from its editorial and algorithmic playlists because "When we look at promotion, we look at issues around hateful conduct, where you have an artist or another creator who has done something off-platform that is so particularly out of line with our values, egregious, in a way that it becomes something that we don't want to associate ourselves with." R. Kelly has faced accusations of sexual abuse, while XXXTentacion was on trial for domestic abuse in a case that did not reach a judgement before his death that June. This policy was revoked in June because the company deemed the original wording to be too "vague"; they stated that "Across all genres, our role is not to regulate artists. Therefore, we are moving away from implementing a policy around artist conduct". However, artists such as Gary Glitter and Lostprophets are still hidden from Spotify's radio stations.

According to some computer science and music experts, various music communities are often ignored or overlooked by music streaming services, such as Spotify. The most commonly perceived error is said to be caused by a lack of diverse scope within curation staff, including overlooking mainstay artists in large genres, potentially causing a categorical homogenization of musical styles; even impacting mainline artists like within hip hop with A Tribe Called Quest. This can potentially have a negative impact on heritage styles, amongst both popular and traditional genres of New Mexico music and folk music, and possibly hindering the growth of styles such as country rap and contemporary Christian music.

In 2016, Spotify was criticized for allegedly making certain artists' music harder to find than others as these artists would release their music to the rival streaming service Apple Music before releasing it to Spotify.

In March 2021, David Dayen argued in The American Prospect  that musicians were in peril due to monopolies in streaming services like Spotify. Daniel Ek, co-founder and CEO of Spotify, discussed "what he called an artist-friendly streaming solution." He explained, "An extension of the internet radio craze of the early 2000s, Spotify would license content from record labels, and then support artists as people listened to their music." However, Dayen noted that such services draw revenue from advertisements, the promise of audience growth to investors, and data collection.

In January 2022, 270 scientists, physicians, professors, doctors, and healthcare workers wrote an open letter to Spotify expressing concern over "false and societally harmful assertions" on Joe Rogan's podcast, The Joe Rogan Experience and asked Spotify to "establish a clear and public policy to moderate misinformation on its platform". The 270 signatories objected to Rogan broadcasting COVID-19 misinformation, citing "a highly controversial" episode featuring guest Robert Malone (#1757). On 26 January, Neil Young removed his music from Spotify after they refused to remove the podcast. Other artists and podcasters, such as Joni Mitchell, Nils Lofgren, Brené Brown, and Crosby, Stills, & Nash, also announced a boycott of Spotify. Spotify promised to add content advisories for anything containing discussions related to COVID-19 and posted additional rules.

 See also 
 Comparison of music streaming services
 List of podcast clients
 Tech companies in the New York metropolitan area
 List of most-streamed songs on Spotify
 List of most-streamed artists on Spotify

 References 

 Further reading 
 Maria Eriksson et al. (2019): Spotify Teardown: Inside the Black Box of Streaming Music'', The MIT Press, .

External links 

 
 

 
Android (operating system) software
Android Auto software
Companies based in Luxembourg City
Companies based in Stockholm
Companies listed on the New York Stock Exchange
Direct stock offerings
IOS software
Jukebox-style media players
Mass media companies established in 2006
Microsoft cloud services
Microsoft websites
Music streaming services
Online music database clients
Podcasting companies
Software that uses Qt
Swedish brands
Swedish companies established in 2006
Symbian software
Universal Windows Platform apps
Windows components
Windows media players
Windows Phone software
Windows software
Xbox One software